University of Denver station is an light rail station in Denver, Colorado, United States. It is served by the E and H Lines, operated by the Regional Transportation District (RTD), and was opened on November 17, 2006. It serves the University of Denver and is located at the north end of campus on Buchtel Boulevard at High Street across from the Ritchie Center. The station features a public art installation entitled Reflective Discourse, consisting of a series of blue steel panels with cut-out words along the length of the station. It was created by John Goe and dedicated in 2006.

References 

RTD light rail stations in Denver
Railway stations in the United States opened in 2006
University of Denver
Railway stations in Colorado at university and college campuses